Sulazepam is a benzodiazepine derivative. It is the thioamide derivative of diazepam. It is metabolised into diazepam, desmethyldiazepam and oxydiazepam. It has sedative, muscle relaxant, hypnotic, anticonvulsant and anxiolytic properties like those of other benzodiazepines. It was never marketed.

Synthesis

Treatment of diazepam with phosphorus pentasulfide produces the corresponding thionamide, sulazepam.

See also 
Uldazepam

References 

Benzodiazepines
Chloroarenes
GABAA receptor positive allosteric modulators
Thioamides